Dairo Paulos (alternatively Da'iro P'awlos or Dahro Caulos) is a village on the outskirts of Asmara, Eritrea.  The name means "Fig of Paul" and is reported to refer to a characteristic tree of the area and a founder of the village. There is a small reservoir near the town.

References

Villages in Eritrea